The  was a Japanese two-seat dive bomber/trainer designed and built by the Yokosuka Naval Air Technical Arsenal. Derived from the Aichi D3A, it was made nearly entirely of wood in an attempt to conserve valuable resources. Upon Japan's surrender, the project came to a halt with only a few aircraft delivered as the Navy Type 99 Bomber Trainer Myojo Model 22.

Design and development
The D3Y was a two-seat bomber trainer constructed of wood, so as not to use more valuable materials. It was based on the successful Aichi D3A with design starting in late 1942. Like the D3A, it was a two-seat low-winged monoplane with a fixed tailwheel undercarriage. To allow construction by unskilled workers, the elliptical wing and rounded tail of the D3A were replaced by straight tapered alternatives, while the fuselage was lengthened to improve stability. Two prototypes were built during 1944, but these proved heavier than expected. Three production aircraft, which were redesigned to save weight, were completed for the Imperial Japanese Navy Air Service before the end of the war, and designated the Navy Type 99 Bomber Trainer Myojo Model 22.

Variants

 D3Y1-K Myojo (Navy Type 99 Bomber Trainer Myojo Model 22)
A two seat wooden dive-bomber trainer. Powered by a  Mitsubishi Kinsei 54 radial engine, based on the Aichi D3A2-K, with significant changes to allow production in wood. Two prototypes and three production aircraft built.

 D3Y2-K Myojo
Single-seat special attack version (Kamikaze) of the D3Y1. The undercarriage would be jettisoned on take off since the aircraft was not expected to return. The prototype had begun construction, but was still incomplete, when the war ended.

 D5Y1 Myojo Kai (Navy Special Attacker Myojo Kai)
 Production designation given to the D3Y2-K.

Operators

Imperial Japanese Navy Air Service

Specifications (D3Y2-K)

See also

References

Further reading

Carrier-based aircraft
D3Y
1940s Japanese bomber aircraft
D3Y